Thout 24 - Coptic Calendar - Thout 26

The twenty-fifth day of the Coptic month of Thout, the first month of the Coptic year. On a common year, this day corresponds to September 22, of the Julian Calendar, and October 5, of the Gregorian Calendar. This day falls in the Coptic season of Akhet, the season of inundation.

Commemorations

Saints 

 The departure of the Great Prophet Jonah, the son of Amittai 
 The martyrdom of Saint Maurice and the Theban Legion

References 

Days of the Coptic calendar